Artur Duarte de Oliveira (born 27 December 1969), sometimes known as just Artur, is a Brazilian former professional footballer who played as a forward, and a current manager.

Playing career
Born in Rio Branco, Acre, Artur Oliveira spent the vast majority of his career in Portugal after starting out professionally at Clube do Remo. He signed in 1992 with Boavista FC, scoring 13 times in 25 games in his first season to help his team to the fourth place.

In the 1996 summer, after 29 league goals in his last two years combined, Artur Oliveira moved to Porto neighbours FC Porto, going on to win six major titles during his three-year spell, including three Primeira Liga championships in a row. On 18 September 1996 he was one of five players to find the net in a 5–0 away win against S.L. Benfica, with the domestic Supercup being conquered 6–0 on aggregate.

Artur Oliveira returned to his homeland in early 1999, going on to make his Série A debuts at nearly 30 with Esporte Clube Vitória. He retired five years later, with his first club Remo.

Managerial career
Artur Oliveira started working as a manager in 2007, with Rio Branco Football Club, to where he returned six years after on 20 August. He was sacked only one month later.

Honours

Player
Vitória
Copa do Nordeste: 1999; Runner-up 2000
Campeonato Baiano: 1999, 2000

Figueirense
Campeonato Catarinense: 2002

Remo
Campeonato Paraense: 1991, 1992, 1993, 2004

Boavista
Supertaça Cândido de Oliveira: 1992
Taça de Portugal: Runner-up 1992–93

Porto
Primeira Liga: 1996–97, 1997–98, 1998–99
Taça de Portugal: 1997–98
Supertaça Cândido de Oliveira: 1996, 1998, Runner-up 1997

Manager
Rio Branco
Campeonato Acriano: 2007

Remo
Campeonato Paraense: 2008

São Raimundo-PA
Campeonato Brasileiro Série D: 2009

References

External links

1969 births
Living people
People from Rio Branco, Acre
Brazilian footballers
Association football forwards
Campeonato Brasileiro Série A players
Campeonato Brasileiro Série B players
Rio Branco Football Club players
Clube do Remo players
Esporte Clube Vitória players
Botafogo de Futebol e Regatas players
Figueirense FC players
Primeira Liga players
Boavista F.C. players
FC Porto players
Brazilian expatriate footballers
Expatriate footballers in Portugal
Brazilian expatriate sportspeople in Portugal
Brazilian football managers
Campeonato Brasileiro Série C managers
Campeonato Brasileiro Série D managers
Rio Branco Football Club managers
Clube do Remo managers
Sportspeople from Acre (state)